Potamosiren is an extinct genus of manatee from the Middle Miocene (Laventan) Honda Group of Colombia.

Phylogeny 
A 2014 cladistic analysis of extinct sirenians recovers Potamosiren as a close relative of modern manatees.

See also 

 Evolution of sirenians

References 

Prehistoric placental genera
Miocene sirenians
Miocene mammals of South America
Laventan
Neogene Colombia
Fossils of Colombia
Honda Group, Colombia
Fossil taxa described in 1951